Parke-Keelogues-Crimlin or Parke GAA is a Gaelic football club located in County Mayo, Ireland.

History
The club was founded in 1970. It main colours are black and amber

References

Gaelic football clubs in County Mayo
Gaelic games clubs in County Mayo